Turner v. Bank of North America, 4 U.S. (4 Dall.) 8 (1799), was a 1799 decision of the United States Supreme Court asserting that "[t]he 11th section of the Judiciary Act, (1 U. S. Stats. at Large, 78.) makes it necessary to state on the record the citizenship of the payee of a negotiable note sued on by an indorsee."

See also
 List of United States Supreme Court cases, volume 4

References

External links
 

United States Supreme Court cases
United States Supreme Court cases of the Ellsworth Court
1799 in United States case law